Yuri Mikhailovich Pugachyov (born 25 February 1991) is a Russian football player.

Club career
He made his debut in the Russian Football National League for FC Volgar Astrakhan on 12 August 2020 in a game against FC Veles Moscow.

References

External links
 
 Profile by Russian Football National League
 

1991 births
Sportspeople from Astrakhan
Living people
Russian footballers
Russia youth international footballers
Association football forwards
FC Ural Yekaterinburg players
Ulisses FC players
FC Avangard Kursk players
FC Neftekhimik Nizhnekamsk players
FC Sakhalin Yuzhno-Sakhalinsk players
FC Zenit-Izhevsk players
FC Volgar Astrakhan players
FC Dynamo Bryansk players
Russian expatriate footballers
Expatriate footballers in Armenia